The Certain Mutinous Crews Act 1797 (37 Geo. III, c. 71) was an Act passed by the British Parliament. The Act was passed in the aftermath of the Spithead and Nore mutinies and declared that those mutineers who refused to surrender were rebels and aimed to restrict intercourse with the mutinous ships upon pain of death.

Notes

External links
 

Great Britain Acts of Parliament 1797
Water transport in the United Kingdom